El Cinco (Spanish for The Five) is one of the 18 barrios of the municipality of San Juan, Puerto Rico and a former barrio of the dissolved municipality of Rio Piedras. As of the 2010 United States Census, it had a population of 6,198 and a land area of 1.34 square miles (3.5 km2) resulting in a population density of 4,625.4/sq mi (1,785.9/km2).

Geography 

El Cinco is surrounded by seven barrios: Gobernador Piñero, Monacillo Urbano, Monacillo, Cupey, Sabana Llana Sur, Río Piedras (pueblo) and Hato Rey Sur.

Landmarks and historic sites 
This barrio is home to numerous sites listed in the US National Register of Historic Places. The historic Río Piedras Aqueduct, also known as the San Juan Historic Aqueduct, is an old aqueduct and water filtration plant that dates from 1846. The site has been listed in the National Register of Historic Places since 2007. Other historic sites located in El Cinco are the Río Piedras Bridge, shared with Hato Rey Sur and dating from 1853, the Rum Pilot Plant located University of Puerto Rico Experimental Agricultural Station, and the San Juan Botanical Garden is located nearby too.

Transportation 
The area is served by the Tren Urbano metro system with the elevated Cupey station located on the intersection of highways PR-1 and PR-176 in El Cinco. Despite the name of the station, it is not located in the barrio of Cupey, although it is indeed located nearby.

Gallery

See also 
 List of communities in Puerto Rico

References 

Río Piedras, Puerto Rico
Cinco